Xwejni Redoubt was a redoubt in Xwejni Bay, limits of Żebbuġ, Gozo, Malta. It was built by the Order of Saint John between 1715 and 1716 as one of a series of coastal fortifications around the coasts of the Maltese Islands.

The redoubt formed part of a chain of fortifications built to defend Marsalforn and nearby bays from Ottoman or Barbary attacks. Although the area was fortified by a number of towers, batteries, redoubts and entrenchments, all of these have been destroyed except for Qolla l-Bajda Battery between Qbajjar and Xwejni Bays.

Xwejni Redoubt was unusual in the sense that it had a semicircular or rectangular platform, while most redoubts were pentagonal.

No remains of the redoubt have survived.

References

Redoubts in Malta
Hospitaller fortifications in Malta
Military installations established in 1715
Demolished buildings and structures in Malta
Żebbuġ, Gozo
Limestone buildings in Malta
18th-century fortifications
1715 establishments in Malta
18th Century military history of Malta